Scoriodyta rakautarensis is a moth of the Psychidae family. It was described by Haettenschwiler in 1989. It is endemic to New Zealand.

References

Moths described in 1989
Moths of New Zealand
Psychidae
Endemic fauna of New Zealand
Endemic moths of New Zealand